Roberto Assagioli (27 February 1888 – 23 August 1974) was an Italian psychiatrist and pioneer in the fields of humanistic and transpersonal psychology. Assagioli founded the psychological movement known as psychosynthesis, which is still being developed today by therapists and psychologists who practice the psychological methods and techniques he developed. His work, including two books and many monographs published as pamphlets, emphasized the possibility of progressive integration (that is, synthesis) of the personality.

Life
Assagioli was born on 27 February 1888 in Venice, Italy, from a middle-class, Jewish background. He was born Roberto Marco Grego, the son of Elena Kaula and Leone Greco. However, his biological father died when Assagioli was two years old, and his mother remarried to Alessandro Emanuele Assagioli soon afterward. Assagioli was exposed to many creative outlets at a young age, such as art and music, which were believed to have inspired his work in Psychosynthesis. By the age of 18, he had learned eight different languages, including Italian (his native tongue), English, French, Russian, Greek, Latin, German, and Sanskrit. It was at this age that he began to travel, mainly to Russia, where he learned about social systems and politics.

In 1922 he married a young woman named Nella Ciapetti, and they had one son, Ilario Assagioli.

In 1940, Assagioli was arrested and imprisoned by Benito Mussolini’s Fascist government, having been accused of "praying for peace and inviting others to join him along with other international crimes." He was placed in a solitary cell in Regina Coeli prison for 27 nights, until he was released and returned to his family. During World War II, his family’s farm in Florence, Italy was destroyed, and both he and his family went into hiding in the Catenaia Alps (in the province of Arezzo) and in the Upper Tiber Valley. His son died at the age of 28 from lung disease, which was accredited to severe stress from the harsh living conditions during the war. After the war ended, Assagioli returned to his work and began his legacy, known as Psychosynthesis.

The years after the war were relatively calm, and it was during this time that he founded various foundations dedicated to Psychosynthesis in Europe and North America. Assagioli lived a long and prosperous life with a happy forty-year marriage until he died at age 86 on 23 August 1974. The cause of his death was unknown.

Assagioli did not like to discuss his personal life, as he preferred to be remembered for his scientific work. Very few biographical accounts about the life of Assagioli are available, and most are not in English.

Education
Assagioli received his first degree in neurology and psychiatry at Istituto di Studii Superiori Pratici e di Perfezionamento, in Florence in 1910. During this time, he began writing articles criticizing psychoanalysis, arguing that he had a more holistic approach.

After finishing his studies in Italy, Assagioli went to Switzerland, where he was trained in psychiatry at the psychiatric hospital Burghölzli in Zürich. This led to him opening the first psychoanalytic practice in Italy, known as Istituto di Psicosintesi. However, his work in psychoanalysis left him unsatisfied with the field of psychiatry; as a whole, he felt that psychoanalysis was incomplete.

Psychosynthesis

Inspiration and development
Assagioli is famous for developing and founding the science of psychosynthesis, a spiritual and holistic approach to psychology that had developed from psychoanalysis.  He was largely inspired by Freud’s idea of the repressed mind and Jung’s theories of the collective unconscious. Trained in psychoanalysis but unsatisfied by what he regarded as its incompleteness as a whole, Assagioli felt that love, wisdom, creativity, and will all were important components that should be included in psychoanalysis.  Assagioli’s earliest development of Psychosynthesis started in 1911, when he began his formal education in psychology. He continued his work on Psychosynthesis right up until his death. Freud and Assagioli were known to have corresponded, although they never had the chance to meet.  Assagioli said, "Psychosynthesis presupposes psychoanalysis, or rather, includes it as a first and necessary stage."

However, Assagioli disagreed with theories formulated by Sigmund Freud that he considered limiting. He refused to accept Freud's reductionism and neglect of the positive dimensions of the personality.  Psychosynthesis became the first approach born of psychoanalysis that also included the artistic, altruistic and heroic potentials of the human being. Assagioli's work was more in alignment with psychologist,  Carl Jung. Both Assagioli and Jung validated the importance of the spiritual level of human existence. Assagioli shared with Jung the insight that psychological symptoms can be triggered by spiritual dynamics. Assagioli considered Jung’s theories to be closest to his understanding of psychosynthesis.

Assagioli accredited much of his inspiration for psychosynthesis to his month-long incarceration in solitary confinement in 1940. He used his time in prison to exercise his mental will by meditating daily. He concluded that he was able to change his punishment into an opportunity to investigate his inner-self.

Psychology Today interview
In the December 1974 issue of Psychology Today, Assagioli was interviewed by Sam Keen, in which Assagioli discussed the differences between Freudian psychoanalysis and psychosynthesis:
We pay far more attention to the higher unconscious and to the development of the transpersonal self. In one of his letters Freud said, "I am interested only in the basement of the human being." Psychosynthesis is interested in the whole building. We try to build an elevator which will allow a person access to every level of his personality. After all, a building with only a basement is very limited. We want to open up the terrace where you can sun-bathe or look at the stars. Our concern is the synthesis of all areas of the personality. That means psychosynthesis is holistic, global and inclusive. It is not against psychoanalysis or even behavior modification but it insists that the needs for meaning, for higher values, for a spiritual life, are as real as biological or social needs. We deny that there are any isolated human problems.

Assagioli noted that Carl Jung, "of all modern psychotherapists, is the closest in theory and practice to psychosynthesis", and further expanded on the similarities between his own and Jung's views:
In the practice of therapy we both agree in rejecting ‘pathologism’ that is, concentration upon morbid manifestations and symptoms of a supposed psychological ‘disease’. We regard man as a fundamentally healthy organism in which there may be temporary malfunctioning. Nature is always trying to re-establish harmony, and within the psyche the principle of synthesis is dominant. Irreconcilable opposites do not exist. The task of therapy is to aid the individual in transforming the personality and integrating apparent contradictions. Both Jung and myself have stressed the need for a person to develop the higher psychic functions, the spiritual dimension.
He also highlighted the differences between Jung's work and psychosynthesis:
Perhaps the best way to state our differences is with a diagram of the psychic functions. Jung differentiates four functions: sensation, feeling, thought, and intuition. Psychosynthesis says that Jung’s four functions do not provide for a complete description of the psychological life. Our view can be visualized like this: We hold that outside imagination or fantasy is a distinct function. There is also a group of functions that impels us toward action in the outside world. This group includes instincts, tendencies, impulses, desires, and aspirations. And here we come to one of the central foundations of psychosynthesis: There is a fundamental difference between drives, impulses, desires, and the will. In the human condition there are frequent conflicts between desire and will. And we will place the will in a central position at the heart of self-consciousness or the ego. 
Assagioli asserted about the will:
The will is not merely assertive, aggressive, and controlling. There is the accepting will,  yielding will, the dedicated will. You might say that there is a feminine polarity to the will – the willing surrender, the joyful acceptance of the other functions of the personality.

At the end of the interview, Keen himself concluded:
It is hard to know what counts as evidence for the validity of a world view and the therapeutic it entails. Every form of therapy has dramatic successes and just as dramatic failures. Enter as evidence in the case for psychosynthesis an ad hominem argument: in speaking about death there was no change in the tone or intensity of Assagioli’s voice and the light still played in his dark eyes, and his mouth was never very far from a smile.

Spiritual work
Assagioli was also interested and active in the field of consciousness and transpersonal work. Having studied theosophy and Eastern philosophy, his written work developed different meditation techniques, including reflective, receptive and creative meditation. He also contributed to several spiritual groups in the tradition known as the "ageless wisdom." He founded two groups intended to teach meditation based on the ideas of the New Age teacher Alice Bailey: The Group for Creative Meditation and the Meditation Group for the New Age. He was also a co-founder of the School for Esoteric Studies, intended to teach the work of Alice Bailey at an advanced level.

Published works
 1906 – Published in Farrari’s Magazine – Gli effetti del riso e le loro applicazioni pedagogiche a.k.a., Smiling Wisdom (Italian)
 1909 - Doctoral dissertation, La Psicosintesi (Italian)
 1965 - Psychosynthesis: A Collection of Basic Writings by Roberto Assagioli  (English)
 1973 - The Act of Will by Roberto Assagioli  (English)
 1993 - (posthumously) Transpersonal Development: The Dimension Beyond Psychosynthesis by Roberto Assagioli  (English)
 2016 - (posthumously) Freedom in Jail by Roberto Assagioli. Ed. by Catherine Ann Lombard, Istituto di Psiconsintesi, Firenze, Italy (English)

See also
 Religion and mythology

References

External links
 Psychosynthesis a collection of journal articles and information about Assagioli and his work
 Video interview with Roberto Assagioli excerpted from the 1973 film Healing the Whole Person
 Psychology Today: The Golden Mean of Roberto Assagioli an electronic copy of the full interview with Sam Keen
 In Memoriam: Roberto Assagioli Dr. Roberto Assagioli, founder of Psychosynthesis
 Roberto Assagioli - his life and work A biography from Kentaur Institute in Denmark
 Six interviews with Roberto Assagioli
 A few words about Dr. Assagioli by Piero Ferrucci
 The Will Project was a project proposed by Roberto Assagioli to explore all aspects and manifestations of the Will.
 Giorgio Antonucci on Roberto Assagioli | Giorgio Antonucci speaks about Roberto Assagioli, Università La Sapienza, Rome (audio, Italian)

1888 births
1974 deaths
20th-century Italian Jews
Italian psychiatrists
Italian psychologists
Italian Theosophists
Jewish psychiatrists
Physicians from Venice
Systems psychologists
20th-century psychologists